A New Testament minuscule is a copy of a portion of the New Testament written in a small, cursive Greek script (developed from Uncial).

Legend
 The numbers (#) are the now standard system of Caspar René Gregory, often referred to as the Gregory-Aland numbers.
 Included among the cataloged minuscules are the following types of manuscripts, color coded:

 Dates are estimated to the nearest 100 year increment where specific date is unknown.
 Content generally only describes sections of the New Testament: Gospels, The Acts of the Apostles (Acts), Pauline epistles, and so on. Sometimes the surviving portion of a codex is so limited that specific books, chapters or even verses can be indicated. Linked articles, where they exist, generally specify content in detail, by verse.
 Digital images are referenced with direct links to the hosting web pages, with the exception of those at the INTF. The quality and accessibility of the images is as follows:

† Indicates the manuscript has damaged or missing pages.
P Indicates only a portion of the books were included. 
K Indicates manuscript also includes a commentary.
S Indicates lost portions of manuscript replaced via supplement of a later hand.
abs (abschrift) Indicates manuscript is copy.
[ ] Brackets around Gregory-Aland number indicate the manuscript belongs to an already numbered manuscript, was found to not be a continuous text manuscript, was found to be written in modern Greek versus Koine Greek, was proved a forgery, or has been destroyed.
 Minuscules 2301-2400

See also 

 List of New Testament papyri
 List of New Testament uncials
 List of New Testament minuscules (1–1000)
 List of New Testament minuscules (1001–2000)
 List of New Testament minuscules (2001–)
 List of New Testament minuscules ordered by Location/Institution
 List of New Testament lectionaries

References

Bibliography 
 
 

2301
New Testament-related lists
Greek New Testament manuscripts
Literature lists